Amphimallon altaicum is a species of beetle in the Melolonthinae subfamily that can be found in Bulgaria, Greece, Romania and southern part of Russia.

References

Beetles described in 1825
altaicum
Beetles of Europe
Taxa named by Carl Gustaf Mannerheim (naturalist)